Sabatino Moscati (24 November 1922 – 8 September 1997) was an Italian archaeologist and linguist known for his work on Phoenician and Punic civilizations. In 1954 he became Professor of Semitic Philology at the University of Rome where he established the Institute of Studies of the Near East.

Sabatino directed a number of excavations, in the process of which he established himself internationally, winning the Lamarmora Prize for his studies of Sardinia, the Selinon Prize for Sicily, the Sybaris Magna Grecia Prize for his research in ancient Italy and the I cavalli d'oro di San Marco for his oriental work.

Bibliography
The Face of the Ancient Orient (1962)
  
The Phoenicians, 2001, I. B. Tauris,

Notes

External links
 New York Times obituary
 Phoenician exhibition

Archaeologists of the Near East
Italian archaeologists
Linguists from Italy
1922 births
1997 deaths
Academic staff of the University of Rome Tor Vergata
20th-century archaeologists
20th-century linguists
Phoenician-punic archaeologists